Broke is a village of approximately 292 people in the Hunter Region of New South Wales, Australia in Singleton Shire.

Description
The Broke area is well known for its boutique wine production and is usually referred to as the 'Broke-Fordwich' wine region (a sub-region of the Australian Geographical Indication (GI) Hunter Valley zone). There is also substantial open-cut and underground coal mining in the area between Broke and Singleton. The village also holds an annual fair in September.

Broke contains a primary school, a Catholic church, an Anglican church and a service station with store and post office. The brick house on the south side of the store is the former police station and lock-up. The south side of Broke provides views across properties to the Broken Back Range, the most conspicuous feature of which is the sandstone formation known as Yellow Rock.

History
Explorers first reached the Broke area in 1818 and land grants followed in 1824. John Blaxland received a grant because he had found a route to the Hunter Valley, while grants also went to George Blaxland and Robert Rodd. The village was given its name by Major Thomas Mitchell, the Surveyor General, who used the name of his English friend Sir Charles Broke-Vere.

John Blaxland had built a mill at the nearby Fordwich by 1860. Six years later, Broke had an Anglican church, a farm implements workshop and a school. The Great North Road was completed and became the main stock route to Sydney; since it passed through Broke, it contributed to further growth of the village, with something like a thousand head of cattle using the route each week. This amount of activity meant that by the late 1800s Broke had several hotels, a post office, a school, a mill, two churches, a hall, a brick kiln, a butchery, bakery and blacksmith.

However, it was not to last. The railways eventually replaced the Great North Road as the main route between Sydney and the Hunter, which meant a drastic drop in traffic through Broke. A railway service between Wollombi and Singleton was proposed but never constructed. Broke reverted to being the quiet village it had originally been. However, a number of significant buildings have survived from the early days. They include the original post office (1882), the village hall (1898), public school (1876), Anglican church and Catholic church, the old police station  and the remains of the Blaxland Homestead on Broke Road.

Population
In the 2016 Census, there were 239 people in Broke. 87.1% of people were born in Australia and 96.6% of people spoke only English at home.

Baiame cave

The site, which is on private property, is popularly known as Baiame Cave and is on the Register of the National Estate.

Gallery

References

External links
 Broke Fordwich Wine Region
 Nightingale Wines – Award Winning Vineyard located in The Broke Fordwich Wine Region

Suburbs of Singleton Council
Towns in the Hunter Region